Rouen Martainville or Gare du Nord was a large railway station serving the city of Rouen, in  Normandy, northern France. The station was situated to the east of the city's centre.

The station was built by Chemin de Fer du Nord and opened on 18 April 1867 and linked Rouen to Amiens and Lille. The station closed in the 1930s and its traffic rerouted to Rue Verte, the station building was rased in 1980 to make space for redevelopment.
The station remained as a goods yard. A short freight line runs from the side of the station to Rouen's docks.

See also
Rouen Rue Verte
Rouen Saint-Sever
Rouen Orléans

References

External links
visite-de-rouen.com

Railway stations in France opened in 1867
Railway stations closed in 1930
Buildings and structures in Rouen
Rouen Martainville
Transport in Rouen